The 16th Canadian Folk Music Awards were presented on April 9 and 10, 2021, to honour achievements in folk music by Canadian artists in 2020. Due to the ongoing COVID-19 pandemic in Canada, the awards were presented in a virtual livestream rather than a physical gala.

Nominations were announced December 1, 2020.

Nominees and recipients
Recipients are listed first and highlighted in boldface.

References

External links
 Canadian Folk Music Awards

16
Canadian Folk Music Awards
Canadian Folk Music Awards
Canadian Folk Music Awards